James, Jimmy or Jim Barrett may refer to:

Sports
James Barrett (rugby union), New Zealand national rugby union footballer, debuted 1913
Jimmy Barrett (baseball) (1875–1921), American Major League Baseball center fielder
Jim Barrett Sr. (1907–1970), English footballer 
Jim Barrett Jr. (1930–2014), English footballer 
Jimmy Barrett (Gaelic footballer) (born 1949), Irish sportsperson
James Barrett (athlete) (1879–1942), Irish track and field athlete

Others
James Barrett, member of the UK band Senser
Jimmy Barrett, a character on the TV series Mad Men, portrayed by Patrick Fischler
James Barrett (colonel) (1710–1779), American militia leader
James Barrett (Civil War) (1827–1865), Union commander at the Battle of Picacho Pass
James Barrett (Vermont judge) (1814–1900), American lawyer, politician and judge
James Barrett (academic) (1862–1945), Australian ophthalmologist and academic administrator
James Lee Barrett (1929–1989), American producer, screenwriter and writer
James Platt Barrett (1838–1916), British teacher of the deaf-and-dumb and lepidopterist
James Barrett (United States Air Force officer) (1919–1994), abortion clinic escort murdered by Paul Jennings Hill
James E. Barrett (1922–2011), United States federal judge
Jim Barrett (winemaker) (1926–2013), American winemaker and owner of Chateau Montelena
James Gresham Barrett (born 1961), American politician